Gary's Gang was an American R&B/pop rock group best known for the U.S. hit "Keep on Dancin'", which reached #41 on the Billboard Hot 100 in 1978. The song also climbed to #8 in the UK Singles Chart, #14 on the Hot Soul Singles chart in 1978 and also made #1 on the Hot Dance Club Play chart, as did two of the group's other songs, "Do It at the Disco" and "Let's Lovedance Tonight". The latter was later used as the sampling background track to Soulsearcher's 1999 #20 club play hit, "Can't Get Enough".

Overview
The group, based in Queens, New York, consisted of Gary Turnier, Eric Matthew aka Joseph Tucci, Al Lauricella, Rino Minetti, Bill Catalano, Bob Forman and Jay Leon.

In the 1980s, Gary's Gang enjoyed further U.S. and European success with the 1982 single "Knock Me Out" (#45 UK) and the 1983 hit "Makin' Music", which reached #8 on the Hot Dance Club Play chart. Brian Chin of Billboard described "Knock Me Out" as "midtempoed and very pop, it shares much of the soft-edged production styling and doowoppish vocals of the group's earlier work".

Discography

Albums

Singles

See also
List of Billboard number-one dance club songs
List of artists who reached number one on the U.S. Dance Club Songs chart

References

External links

Gary's Gang at AllMusic

American pop rock music groups
American dance music groups
Musical groups established in 1977
Musical groups disestablished in 1985
American disco groups
SAM Records artists